Katarzyna Skorupa (born 16 September 1984) is a Polish volleyball player. She was part of the Poland women's national volleyball team. She competed with the national team at the 2008 Summer Olympics in Beijing, China. She has played for Imoco Volley Conegliano since 2016. She is openly lesbian.

Clubs
  Farmutil (2008)
  Fenerbahçe Grundig (2015-2016)
  Imoco Volley Conegliano (2016–2017)
  Igor Novara (2017–2018)
  Pomì Casalmaggiore (2018–2019)
  Saugella Team Monza (2019–2020)
  E.Leclerc Moya Radomka Radom (2020–)

References

1984 births
Living people
Polish women's volleyball players
Place of birth missing (living people)
Volleyball players at the 2008 Summer Olympics
Olympic volleyball players of Poland
Polish LGBT sportspeople
LGBT volleyball players
Lesbian sportswomen
People from Radom